London Road is the second studio album by British  electronic rock band Modestep. Name, start of pre-sales (23 February 2015) and release date (25 May 2015) through INgrooves label, were announced on 22 February 2015 in their live show Modestep Radio which was streamed on YouTube and their page.

Background and recording
After the release of their debut Evolution Theory, Josh and Tony Friend took a year off from touring to work on their next record. The brothers had had two band members leave and were dissatisfied with how their first album had come together, saying it felt "rushed" as they were touring "300 days a year". With London Road, the band wanted to create a single, unified work that defined them as a band without it feeling like "a bunch of singles". Working with new band members Kyle Deek and Pat Lundy, London Road was announced on February 22, 2015, and released three months later.

The album features a number of collaborations. The opening song, "Damien", features a monologue by actor Alan Ford, while "Game Over" features six different grime MCs. Speaking about the high number of co-productions on the album, Josh stated:

Track listing

Charts

Release history

References

2015 albums
Modestep albums